Josef Plachý (born 1 April 1971) is a Czech table tennis player. He competed at the 1996 Summer Olympics and the 2000 Summer Olympics.

References

1971 births
Living people
Czech male table tennis players
Olympic table tennis players of the Czech Republic
Table tennis players at the 1996 Summer Olympics
Table tennis players at the 2000 Summer Olympics
Sportspeople from Kladno